The men's high jump at the 2018 IAAF World Indoor Championships took place at Arena Birmingham in Birmingham, United Kingdom, on 1 March 2018.

The previous world indoor champion, Italy's Gianmarco Tamberi, was not present to defend his title, though both minor medallists were present in Great Britain's Robert Grabarz and American Erik Kynard.

With the pits back to back in the center of the arena and no events on the track, the men shared center stage with the women's high jump.

Summary

Kynard and Przybylko both failed to achieve that height and the German athlete secured the bronze on countback – his first senior international medal. It was the first world title for the Russian, competing as an Authorised Neutral Athlete here, and reversed the positions the two had shared at the 2017 World Championships final the previous summer.

Records

Results
The final was started at 18:45.

References

high jump
High jump at the World Athletics Indoor Championships
2018 in men's athletics